Blues Alive is a live album by Northern Irish guitarist Gary Moore, released in May 1993. It is a collection of recordings taken from his 1992 tour and draws most of its material from Moore's then-recent Still Got the Blues and After Hours albums. It was by far the most successful of all his live albums, reaching number 8 on the UK Albums Chart and being certified Gold. Its release was preceded by the single "Parisienne Walkways" (live).

Track listing

 "Cold Day in Hell" (Gary Moore) – 5:35
 "Walking By Myself" (Kirke, Lane, Jimmy Rogers) – 5:00
 "Story of the Blues" (Moore) – 7:32
 "Oh, Pretty Woman" (A.C. Williams) – 4:25
 "Separate Ways" (Moore) – 5:48
 "Too Tired" (Maxwell Davis, Johnny "Guitar" Watson, Saul Bihari) – 4:34
 "Still Got the Blues" (Moore) – 6:44
 "Since I Met You Baby" (Moore) – 3:02
 "The Sky Is Crying" (Elmore James, Clarence Lewis, Morgan Robinson) – 8:50
 "Further on Up the Road" (Joe Medwick, Don Robey) – 5:34
 "King of the Blues" (Moore) – 6:13
 "Parisienne Walkways" (Phil Lynott, Moore) – 7:03
 "Jumpin' at Shadows" (Duster Bennett) – 5:51

Personnel
Gary Moore – guitar / vocals
Tommy Eyre – keyboards
Andy Pyle – bass guitar
Graham Walker – drums
Martin Drover – trumpet
Frank Mead – alto saxophone / harmonica
Nick Pentalow – tenor saxophone
Nick Payn – baritone saxophone
Candy Mackenzie – backing vocals
Carol Thompson – backing vocals
Guest musician Albert Collins appears on "Too Tired" on guitar and vocals.

Charts

References

Gary Moore live albums
1993 live albums
Virgin Records live albums